Greencastle is a city in Greencastle Township, Putnam County, Indiana, United States, and the county seat of Putnam County. It was founded in 1821 by Ephraim Dukes on a land grant. He named the settlement for his hometown of Greencastle, Pennsylvania.  Greencastle was a village or town operating under authority of the Putnam County commissioners until March 9, 1849, when it became a town by special act of the local legislature. Greencastle, Indiana, officially became a city after an election held on July 8, 1861.  The first mayor of Greencastle was E. R. Kercheval, a member of the Freemason Temple Lodge #47. The city became the county seat of Putnam County. The population was 10,326 at the 2010 census. It is located near Interstate 70 approximately halfway between Terre Haute and Indianapolis in the west-central portion of the state.  Greencastle is well known as being the location of DePauw University.

Education
Public schools

Greencastle's public schools are operated by the Greencastle Community School Corporation.  The Greencastle School Corporation consists of one Central Office; one High School, Greencastle High School, which hosts grades 9th through 12th; one Middle School, Greencastle Middle School, which hosts grades 6th through 8th; one Intermediate School, Tzouanakis Intermediate School, which hosts grades 3rd through 5th and two Primary Schools, Martha J. Ridpath Primary School (also known as Ridpath Primary) and Deer Meadow Primary School
which each host kindergarten through 2nd grade.

Private schools

Peace Lutheran School is a private school in Greencastle, Indiana, which according to their website is "an outreach of Peace Lutheran Church."  It was founded in 1984 as a preschool.  In 1995, kindergarten was added as a half-day program. The year 2002 marked the beginning of the Primary School with the addition of 5th grade. (In Indiana, Primary Schools are typically interpreted as 1st through 2nd, 3rd, or 4th grades.)  As of 2011, the school hosts grades kindergarten through 6th grade.

Colleges and universities

DePauw University is a private national liberal arts college.  It was founded as Indiana Asbury University in 1837 as an all men's school.   In 1867, Laura Beswick, Mary Simmons, Alice Allen, and Bettie Locke Hamilton (then Bettie Locke), the chief founder of Kappa Alpha Theta, America's first college women's fraternity, became the University's first four female co-eds.

DePauw today has an enrollment of about 2400 students. Students hail from 42 states and 32 countries with a 20.4% multicultural enrollment. DePauw's liberal arts education gives students a chance to gain general knowledge outside of their direct area of study. DePauw consistently ranks among the top 50 liberal arts colleges in America in both U.S. News & World Report rankings and Kiplinger's “best value” list. In a 2009 Center for College Affordability & Productivity ranking published in Forbes magazine, DePauw was ranked No. 42 under “America’s Best Colleges.”

Ivy Tech Community College (also Ivy Tech) is the nation's largest statewide community college with single accreditation.  A 33,300 square foot, $8.6 million Ivy Tech campus was completed in 2009 in Greencastle.  The Ivy Tech branch in Greencastle is also assisted financially by The Putnam County Community Foundation.

Other educational facilities

Greencastle is the home of the Putnam County Public Library, a public library which serves patrons from Putnam County and surrounding counties. Services include books, books on CD, ebooks, movies, music, newspapers, magazines, computer and Internet access, Wi-fi, inter-library loan, programming for all ages, author series, book discussion groups and multiple public meeting rooms. The PCPL Local History and Genealogy Department is dedicated to collecting, preserving, and providing public access to Putnam County's historical records. As of 2017 the library began an adult literacy program, the Putnam Adult Literacy Services (PALS). In conjunction with the PALS program, the PALS Pups program allows children to read to the certified "good citizen" dogs. The Putnam County Public Library is a Carnegie Library and was built in 1903.  In 1996, a large addition made the library what it is today.

Greencastle also once had a municipal Carnegie library, which is now known as The William Weston Clarke Emison Museum of Art (otherwise known as The Emison Museum of Art or The Emison Art Center). The library became a museum in 1986, and was renamed to honor the financial contributions of James W. Emison, a longtime member of DePauw University's Board of Trustees and benefactor of the University, and other Emison family members. The building was constructed in 1908. The Emison Art Center was originally the Depauw University (then, Indiana Asbury University) campus library.

The Putnam County Museum houses a "permanent collection of nearly 2,000 Putnam County related artifacts offers the county residents and visitors a historical overview of the county, including its significance during the Civil War and a glimpse into everyday life of Putnam residents in the past. The Museum also showcases the Putnam County contemporary artists in revolving exhibits, featuring at least one new artist every month."

Events

Annual Greencastle Music Fest 
The Greencastle Music Fest was originally created in 2010 by restaurateur Gail Smith to celebrate the 20th anniversary of Almost Home Restaurant on the square in Greencastle, IN. The event was an instant success and has grown in size every year.

Downtown Greencastle Farmers' Market 
The Farmers' Market in Greencastle is a weekly celebration of quality local food and community of the square. The market is open from 8:00 AM until noon on Saturdays from May through October.

First Friday Greencastle 
On the first Friday of every month downtown Greencastle blocks off part of the courthouse square with an evening of music, arts, shopping, and food. First Fridays start in April and end in October.

Monon Bell Game 
The Monon Bell football game is the annual contest between the DePauw University Tigers and the Wabash College Little Giants. The rivalry between DePauw and Wabash began in 1890 and more than 100 games have been played. The Monon Bell game was voted Indiana's best football rivalry by ESPN fans. During the week of the game, both schools have numerous events and shared functions including concerts, debates, and a blood drive.

Music on the Square 
Music on the Square, a community music space hosted by the DePauw School of Music, fosters courageous music making. Gathering as a community of music lovers, M2 programming sparks curiosity, expands creativity, and cultivates collaboration through one-on-one lessons, adult-learner classes, and radical, breathtaking performances.

Putnam County 4-H Fair 
The Putnam County 4-H Fair takes place in Greencastle, IN during the last full week of July. The Sunday before the start of the Fair, the Putnam County 4-H Fair Parade takes place in downtown Greencastle.

The Richard E. Peeler Art Center 
Designed by the internationally acclaimed architect, Carlos Jimenez, professor at Rice University's School of Architecture, the Richard E. Peeler Art Center opened its doors in August 2002 and was later dedicated during a ceremony October 11, 2002. The Peeler Art Center features three spacious, state-of-the-art galleries.

The galleries host approximately twelve exhibitions annually featuring the work of students and faculty as well as regionally and internationally acclaimed artists. Included among the Peeler Art Center's 80,000 square feet are a large exhibition space; a 90-seat auditorium with state-of-the-art acoustics, designed for public events, films, and recitals; classroom and studio space for pottery, sculpture, painting, and photography; and offices for the art department faculty. The building is the first in DePauw's 165-year history to be dedicated to the teaching, creation, and display of art.

The Building is named for Richard E. Peeler, a 1949 graduate of DePauw. Peeler returned to his alma mater in 1958 to teach ceramics, sculpture, and photography. He retired in 1972, and with his wife and partner, Marj, worked as a full-time potter in Putnam County until his death in 1998.

Points of interest

Big Walnut Sports Park 
This 80 acre park is owned and operated jointly by the City of Greencastle and by a not-for-profit corporation. The park features ball diamonds, soccer fields, a loop trail, disc golf, and picnic areas.

DePauw University Nature Park 
In September 2003, DePauw University announced the acquisition of over 520 acres west of campus to develop a nature park. The property lies along Big Walnut Creek providing the opportunity for hiking, rock climbing, canoeing, and a host of outdoor educational activities.

The park features 8.7 miles of trails, a welcome center, a field station, an amphitheater, and the Janet Prindle Institute for Ethics.

Jaycee Park 
Jaycee Park is a 22-acre City of Greencastle park that features a fishing pond, picnic areas, and a shelter house.

People Pathways 
People Pathways is a network of trails and signed routes around Greencastle that also links to neighboring communities.

Putnam County Playhouse 
Started in 1962, this summer stock, an all volunteer organization, produces four plays each summer. Productions range from drama to comedy to musicals. Special programs are offered each summer for children and teens.

Robe Ann Park 
A twenty-five acre City of Greencastle park featuring an Olympic size swimming pool with water slide and diving board, the Emerald Palace playground, picnic areas, lighted ball diamond, and lighted tennis courts.

Geography
Greencastle is located at  (39.642297, −86.855988).

Demographics

2020 census 
As of the census of 2020, there were 9,820 people, 3,446 households, and 1,989 families residing in the city. There were 3,908 housing units. The racial makeup of the city was 88.9% White, 1.8% African American, 0.2% Native American, 5.5% Asian, 0.1% from other races, and 3.4% from two or more races. Hispanic or Latino of any race were 2.7% of the population.

There were 3,446 households. The average household size was 2.10 and the average family size was 2.93.

Age and sex: 4.3% of residents were under the age of 5 years; 18.2% of residents were under the age of 18; and 14.5% were 65 years of age or older. The gender makeup of the city was 49.4% male and 50.6% female.

2010 census
As of the census of 2010, there were 10,326 people, 3,368 households, and 1,989 families residing in the city. The racial makeup of the city was 92.4% White, 2.7% African American, 0.3% Native American, 1.9% Asian, 0.9% from other races, and 1.8% from two or more races. Hispanic or Latino of any race were 2.5% of the population.

There were 3,368 households, of which 30.9% had children under the age of 18 living with them, 42.0% were married couples living together, 12.9% had a female householder with no husband present, 4.2% had a male householder with no wife present, and 40.9% were non-families. 35.9% of all households were made up of individuals, and 15.4% had someone living alone who was 65 years of age or older. The average household size was 2.27 and the average family size was 2.93.

The median age in the city was 27.4 years. 19% of residents were under the age of 18; 28.5% were between the ages of 18 and 24; 19.7% were from 25 to 44; 18.6% were from 45 to 64; and 14.2% were 65 years of age or older. The gender makeup of the city was 46.7% male and 53.3% female.

2000 census
As of the census of 2000, there were 9,880 people, 3,353 households, and 2,038 families residing in the city. The racial makeup of the city was 93.91% White, 2.67% African American, 0.25% Native American, 1.36% Asian, 0.08% Pacific Islander, 0.68% from other races, and 1.05% from two or more races. Hispanic or Latino of any race were 1.43% of the population.

There were 3,353 households, out of which 30.2% had children under the age of 18 living with them, 46.1% were married couples living together, 11.9% had a female householder with no husband present, and 39.2% were non-families. 34.3% of all households were made up of individuals, and 13.9% had someone living alone who was 65 years of age or older. The average household size was 2.28 and the average family size was 2.93.

In the city, the population was spread out, with 20.2% under the age of 18, 27.3% from 18 to 24, 22.2% from 25 to 44, 15.9% from 45 to 64, and 14.3% who were 65 years of age or older. The median age was 27 years. For every 100 females, there were 88.1 males. For every 100 females age 18 and over, there were 82.2 males.

The median income for a household in the city was $29,798, and the median income for a family was $41,250. Males had a median income of $30,940 versus $20,889 for females. The per capita income for the city was $15,351. About 7.6% of families and 9.8% of the population were below the poverty line, including 9.8% of those under age 18 and 11.3% of those age 65 or over.

Notable people
  William Atherton (soldier) (1793-1863)
  Charles A. Beard (1874-1948) and Mary Ritter Beard (1876-1958), American historians
  Pearl Bryan (d. 1896), murder victim
  Samuel T. Busey (1833-1909), Civil War general and politician
  Amalia Küssner Coudert (1863-1932), miniaturist
  William Michael Crose (1867-1929), Governor of American Samoa
  S. H. Dudley (1864-1947), singer and pioneer recording artist
  Bob Flanigan (1926-2011), singer with The Four Freshmen
  Glenn Gass, (born 1956) rock 'n' roll music educator
  Jane Louise Kelly (born 1964), Federal appellate judge 8th Circuit
  Eli Lilly lived in Greencastle for several years; he opened a drugstore in Greencastle in 1861
  Alexander Campbell Stevenson (1802-1889), Indiana physician and state legislator
  Jesse W. Weik (1857-1930), Abraham Lincoln biographer
  Tad Robinson (born 1956), blues singer
  Garfield Thomas Haywood (1880-1931), pastor and founder Pentecostal Assemblies of the World

Historical Events and Places In Greencastle

Events
John Herbert Dillinger, Jr. (June 22, 1903 – July 22, 1934) was an American gangster and bank-robber in the Depression-era United States. He was charged, but never convicted, with the murder of an East Chicago police officer whom he shot in the knee while fleeing the scene of his heist. John Dillinger's largest haul (i.e. bank robbery) was at the Central National Bank in Greencastle, Indiana, one of six banks he robbed in Indiana. In Our Past, Their Present: Historical Essays on Putnam County Indiana, John J. Baughman writes, "On Monday, October 23, 1933, four armed men entered the Central National Bank of Greencastle and escaped with $74,782.09.  The Dillinger robbery became one of the major events of Greencastle history."
In March 2011, Greencastle was one of two Indiana cities selected as a “Stellar Community” by the state of Indiana.

Places
Greencastle and the surrounding Putnam County communities are home to 20 historical sites according to the National Register of Historic Places.

In Greencastle:
 The Appleyard, farm of Alexander C. Stevenson
 The Boulders house
 Brick Chapel United Methodist Church
 Courthouse Square Historic District
 Delta Kappa Epsilon Fraternity house
 East College of DePauw University
 Forest Hill Cemetery
 Richard M. Hazelett house ("Sunny Hill")
 Alfred Hirt House
 McKim Observatory, DePauw University
 F.P. Nelson house ("The Towers")
 Old Greencastle Historic District
 Lycurgus Stoner House
 William C. Van Arsdel house ("The Elms")
Surrounding communities:
 Samuel Brown house ("The Brick"), Roachdale
 Melville F. McHaffie Farm ("Schuyler Arnold Seed Farm"), Stilesville
 James Edington Montgomery O'Hair house, Brick Chapel
 Putnam County Bridge No. 159 ("Reelsville Bridge"), Reelsville
 Putnamville Presbyterian Church ("Putnamville Methodist Church"), Putnamville

Greencastle also has three historic neighborhoods – Old Greencastle, the Eastern Enlargement and the Northwood Neighborhood that were added to the National Register of Historic Places in 2011.

Climate
Humid continental climate is a climatic region typified by large seasonal temperature differences, with warm to hot (and often humid) summers and cold (sometimes severely cold) winters.  The Köppen Climate Classification subtype for this climate is "Dfa"(Hot Summer Continental Climate).

References

External links

 City of Greencastle, Indiana website
 Greencastle Putnam County Development Center
 Greencastle Chamber of Commerce
 Putnam County Public Library

Cities in Putnam County, Indiana
County seats in Indiana
Scotch-Irish American history
Cities in Indiana